Adapter molecule crk also known as proto-oncogene c-Crk is a protein that in humans is encoded by the CRK gene.

The CRK protein participates in the Reelin signaling cascade downstream of DAB1.

Function 

Adapter molecule crk is a member of an adapter protein family that binds to several tyrosine-phosphorylated proteins. This protein has several SH2 and SH3 domains (src-homology domains) and is involved in several signaling pathways, recruiting cytoplasmic proteins in the vicinity of tyrosine kinase through SH2-phosphotyrosine interaction. The N-terminal SH2 domain of this protein functions as a positive regulator of transformation whereas the C-terminal SH3 domain functions as a negative regulator of transformation. Two alternative transcripts encoding different isoforms with distinct biological activity have been described.

Crk together with CrkL participates in the Reelin signaling cascade downstream of DAB1.

v-Crk, a transforming oncoprotein from avian sarcoma viruses, is a fusion of viral "gag" protein with the SH2 and SH3 domains of cellular Crk. The name Crk is from "CT10 Regulator of Kinase" where CT10 is the avian virus from which was isolated a protein, lacking kinase domains, but capable of stimulating phosphorylation of tyrosines in cells.

Crk should not be confused with Src, which also has cellular (c-Src) and viral (v-Src) forms and is involved in some of the same signaling pathways but is a protein tyrosine-kinase.

Interactions
CRK (gene) has been shown to interact with:

 BCAR1, 
 Cbl gene, 
 Dock180, 
 EPS15, 
 Epidermal growth factor receptor, 
 Grb2, 
 IRS4,
 MAP4K1, 
 MAPK8, 
 NEDD9, 
 PDGFRA, 
 PDGFRB, 
 PTK2, 
 Paxillin 
 RAPGEF1, 
 RICS, 
 SH3KBP1,  and
 SOS1.

See also
CrkL, "Crk-like" protein

References

Further reading

External links
Crk Info with links in the Cell Migration Gateway
 
 
 

Genes
Human proteins